Airbus UK is a wholly owned subsidiary of Airbus which produces wings for Airbus aircraft. When Airbus was incorporated as a joint-stock company in 2001, BAE Systems transferred its UK Airbus facilities in return for a 20% share of the new company. These facilities became Airbus UK. The company has two main sites responsible for the design and manufacture of the high-technology wings for all Airbus models as well as overall design and supply of the fuel system. For most Airbus models, the company is responsible for overall design and supply of landing gear. The company employs around 13,000 people at two sites: Filton, where the engineering and design activity takes place along with some manufacturing, and Broughton, where other major wing component manufacturing and all wing assembly takes place.

History

Hawker Siddeley (which merged with British Aircraft Corporation (BAC) in 1977 to form British Aerospace) was part of the first Airbus project, the Airbus A300. The British government withdrew support in 1969 but Hawker Siddeley was allowed to continue as supplier of the aircraft's wings due to the advanced stages of design and the reluctance of other nations to take over the wing design. In 1979 BAe rejoined the Airbus consortium. In 2001 Airbus Industries became Airbus S.A.S., the Airbus Integrated Company.

Airbus UK started work on the wings for the Airbus A380 in August 2002.

In April 2006 BAE Systems announced its intention to sell its share of Airbus SAS to EADS. BAE originally sought to agree a price with EADS through an informal process. However, due to the slow pace of negotiations and disagreements over price, BAE exercised its put option which saw investment bank Rothschild appointed to give an independent valuation.

On 2 July 2006 Rothschild valued BAE's stake at £1.9 billion (€2.75 billion); well below the expectation of BAE, analysts and even EADS. On 5 July 2006 BAE appointed independent auditors to study why the value of its share of Airbus had fallen from the original estimates to the Rothschild valuation. On 6 September 2006 BAE agreed to sell its stake in Airbus to EADS for £1.87 billion (€2.75 billion, $3.53 billion), pending BAE shareholder approval. On 4 October shareholders voted in favour of the sale.

Sites
Airbus wing design and production was assigned to UK largely because of the advanced wing design of Hawker Siddeley Trident (D.H.121), designed by De Havilland. In the early days of Airbus, De Havilland design teams based in Hatfield worked on Airbus wing design and wing assembly was carried out in Broughton (a De Havilland manufacturing site). After Hawker Siddeley (the parent company of De Havilland) had become part of British Aerospace, the Hatfield site was closed. From the 1990s onwards, Airbus design work has been carried out at the Filton site, which was originally the Bristol Aeroplane Company.

Filton
The Filton site is located on the former Bristol Aeroplane Company site, which was later used as the final assembly line for the British-built Concorde aircraft (the French-built Concordes were assembled in Toulouse, which is also now an Airbus site).

Airbus Filton employs over 4,500 people in a variety of roles. The site is responsible for the design of the wing structure, fuel systems and landing gear integration. Some manufacturing also takes place in Filton, including the wing assembly for the A400M. Aerodynamics work, research and testing is also carried out. In 2008, Airbus sold most of the component manufacturing activities on the Filton site to GKN, which continues to use these facilities to manufacture Airbus parts as a subcontractor. In 2011 Airbus announced the construction of a new office complex, referred to as the "Aerospace Park", at the Filton site.

Broughton
The current Airbus Broughton site was founded in 1939 as a shadow factory for the production of the Vickers Wellington and the Avro Lancaster. After the War De Havilland took over the factory and it was used to produce various aircraft, including the Mosquito and the Comet.

Today Airbus Broughton employs over 6,500 people, mostly in manufacturing roles. The site is responsible for the wing assembly for all Airbus aircraft, with the exception of the Chinese A320s (these wings are assembled in China) and the A400M (assembled in Filton). Airbus wings are transported by Airbus Beluga or ship (in the case of the A380) to the final assembly lines at Airbus Toulouse.

Aircraft
Airbus A300 (production ceased)
Airbus A310 (production ceased)
Airbus A310 MRTT
Airbus A320 family
Airbus A330
Airbus A330 MRTT
Airbus A340 (production ceased)
Airbus A350
Airbus A380 (production ceased)
Airbus A400M
Airbus Beluga

See also
Airbus UK F.C., an Airbus UK football club based in Wales.

References

Airbus subsidiaries and divisions
Aerospace companies of the United Kingdom
Manufacturing companies established in 1997
British brands
Manufacturing companies based in Bristol
British companies established in 1997
British subsidiaries of foreign companies